Keith Edwin Bertschin (born 25 August 1956) is an English former professional football player and coach.

A Striker, Bertschin began his professional career with Ipswich Town (1973–1977), before playing for Birmingham City (1977–1981), Norwich City (1981–1982; 1982–1984), Stoke City (1984–1987), Sunderland (1987–1988), Walsall (1988–1990), Chester City (1990–1991) and Aldershot (1991–1992). He also played non-League football and had a short spell playing in the United States with the Jacksonville Tea Men in 1982.

Playing career
Bertschin was born in Enfield and began his career with Barnet before joining Ipswich Town in 1973. He made a perfect start to professional football scoring on his debut scoring the winning goal in a 2–1 victory over Arsenal in April 1976. He scored again two days later against West Ham United. He became a full member of the squad in 1976–77 scoring six goals in 30 appearances as Ipswich finished in 3rd position. Bertschin joined Birmingham City in July 1977 for a fee of £135,000. He spent four seasons at St Andrew's making 143 appearances scoring 41 goals and helped the club gain promotion in 1979–80. Bertschin joined Norwich City in August 1981 and helped the Canaries gain promotion to the First Division in 1981–82. He scored twice against his old club Birmingham in a 5–1 victory earning Norwich their first victory of the 1982–83 season. He spent the summer of 1982 playing in the United States for Jacksonville Tea Men.

Bertschin left Carrow Road in November 1984 to join Stoke City. Stoke were rock bottom of the table when Bertschin joined in 1984–85 and he could do little to prevent the side failing to an embarrassing relegation which saw Stoke go down with a then record low points tally. In 1985–86 had a fine season top-scoring with 23 goals, 19 coming in the league and he won the player of the year award. Unfortunately for Stoke he was their only consistent goalscorer and the side finished in a mid-table position of 10th. He scored eight goals in 27 appearances in 1986–87 before he was sold to Sunderland in March 1987. He couldn't prevent Sunderland being relegated but played a major role in 1987–88 which saw the Black Cats win the Third Division title. Bertschin ended his professional career at Walsall, Chester City and Aldershot before dropping into non-league football.

Bertschin played for Solihull Borough, Evesham United and was a member of the Barry Town team which won the Welsh Cup in 1994 with a 2–1 victory against Cardiff City. He then went on to play for Worcester City, Hednesford Town, Tamworth and finally Stafford Rangers.

Coaching career
After retiring from playing, he worked as an agent for a number of players before his appointment to the coaching staff at Birmingham City. In November 2007, when Birmingham manager Steve Bruce left to join Wigan Athletic, Bertschin and other members of Birmingham's backroom staff accompanied him. In June 2009, when Bruce moved on to Sunderland, Bertschin again followed. On 29 June 2012 it was announced that Bertschin had taken up the post of first team coach at Hull City. On 2 August 2016, the club sacked Bertschin from his position of first team coach.

Bertschin took temporary charge of Solihull Moors on 9 November 2016 following the departure of Marcus Bignot. He was then assistant manager at Solihull and was then appointed first-team coach of the Solihull Moors Ladies team.

Career statistics

Honours
 Birmingham City
 Football League Second Division third-place promotion: 1979–80

 Norwich City
 Football League Second Division third-place promotion: 1981–82

 Stoke City
 Stoke City player of the year: 1986

 Sunderland
 Football League Third Division champions: 1987–88

References
General
Canary Citizens by Mark Davage, John Eastwood, Kevin Platt, published by Jarrold Publishing, (2001), 
 
 
 

Specific

External links
 Career information at ex-canaries.co.uk

1956 births
Living people
Footballers from Enfield, London
English footballers
England under-21 international footballers
Association football forwards
Barnet F.C. players
Ipswich Town F.C. players
Birmingham City F.C. players
North American Soccer League (1968–1984) players
Norwich City F.C. players
Jacksonville Tea Men players
Stoke City F.C. players
Sunderland A.F.C. players
Walsall F.C. players
Chester City F.C. players
Aldershot F.C. players
Solihull Borough F.C. players
Evesham United F.C. players
Barry Town United F.C. players
Worcester City F.C. players
Hednesford Town F.C. players
Tamworth F.C. players
Stafford Rangers F.C. players
English Football League players
Sunderland A.F.C. non-playing staff
Hull City A.F.C. non-playing staff
English expatriate sportspeople in the United States
Expatriate soccer players in the United States
English expatriate footballers